Dongmyo Station is a station on the Seoul Subway Line 1 and Line 6. It is named after a nearby shrine, built during the Joseon dynasty to honor Guan Yu, arguably the most famous Chinese military general from the Three Kingdoms era.

Seoul Metro trains on Line 1 that are serviced at the Gunja Train Depot behind Yongdap Station operate up to this station, before taking a track that connects to Sinseol-dong Station on Line 2.

Station layout

Vicinity

 Exit 1 : Sungin Park
 Exit 3 : Dongmyo
 Exit 4 : Changsin Elementary School
 Exit 8 : Dongdaemun
 Exit 9 : Doosan APT

References

Seoul Metropolitan Subway stations
Metro stations in Jongno District
Railway stations opened in 2000